Catalina Isabel Palacios Galindo, nickname Cata Palacios  (born February 16, 1980, in Santiago) is a Chilean actress, singer and television presenter. She is known mostly for being in the cast of the youth program Mekano, for her role in the 2005 television series Magi-K, and for being the host of the youth program Yingo. She has participated in the 2008 Chilean telethon, Chile ayuda a Chile, and Dancing with the Stars.

Television

Programs
2002-2003 -	Mekano
2004-2006 -	Zoolo TV
2004 - Cuento Contigo
2005 - Código F.A.M.A
2005-2006 -	Entretemundo
2007 -	El baile en TVN
2007-2011 -	Yingo
2008 -	Sin vergüenza
2008 -	Teatro en Chilevisión
2009 -	Festival del Huaso de Olmué
2011 -	Fiebre de baile 4
2011 -	Festival de Viña del Mar
2012 -	Tu cara me suena
2013 -	SaV
2014 - Festival Viva Dichato
2014 - Súper Bueno

Series
On Mega
2003: Amores urbanos as Isidora
2004-2005: BKN as Rocio Valtierra
2004: Profesionales as Lara
2005-2006: Magi-K as Isidora "Isi"
2007: Casado con hijos as invited artist

On Chilevisión
2010: Don diablo as Blanca "Blanquita" 
2011: Vampiras as Tábata Romanov

Theatre
2007: La Cenicienta as Cenicienta
2013: La bella y la bestia as Bella
2015: Regresarás, el musical as herself
2016: El collar de las Momias as Lila

Discography

Albums
2006: Eclipse
2009: Kata
2018: Déjate llevar

Singles
2006: "Sobre la luna"
2009: "Regresarás"
2009: "Cierra la puerta"
2010: "Ya no quiero verte"
2012: "Paradise"
2013: "Baby"	
2014: "Te voy amar (with Tim Jones)
2014: "Fiesta en la ciudad
2016: "Ayer"

Musical Tours
2012: Catalina Palacios Tour 2012

References

External links

1980 births
Living people
People from Santiago
21st-century Chilean women singers
Chilean actresses
Chilean television presenters
Chilean women television presenters